Delwin Morgan Clawson (January 11, 1914 – May 5, 1992) was an American politician. He was a member of the U.S. House of Representatives. He also served as mayor of Compton, California.

Clawson was born in Thatcher, Arizona and attended Gila College there in 1933 and 1934. He was manager of the Mutual Housing Association of Compton from 1947 to 1963.

Clawson was elected as a member of the City Council of Compton and served from 1953 to 1957. He then served as mayor of Compton, California from 1957 to 1963. After the death of Clyde Doyle, he was elected as a Republican to the 88th Congress, by special election. He was reelected to the seven succeeding Congresses and served until his retirement at the end of his last term on December 31, 1978.

Personal life
Clawson was a Latter-day Saint. He was the son of Charles M. Clawson and Edna Allen.

Death
Clawson died in Downey, California, on May 5, 1992.

See also
 List of members of the House Un-American Activities Committee

References

External links
 
 

1914 births
1992 deaths
Eastern Arizona College alumni
Latter Day Saints from Arizona
Mayors of Compton, California
Republican Party members of the United States House of Representatives from California
20th-century American politicians
Latter Day Saints from California